Bioimaging, the imaging of biological materials, may refer to:
 medical imaging
 microscopy